Westworld 2000 is a video game developed by American studio Brooklyn Multimedia and published by Byron Preiss Multimedia for Windows in 1996.

Gameplay
Westworld 2000 is a first-person, 3D shooter based on the 1973 film Westworld.

Reception
Next Generation reviewed the game, rating it one star out of five, and stated that "The idea is fine, it's the execution that hurts. The first-person engine is sluggish, like something developed before even Wolfenstein 3D. The delay between a keypress and actual movement is unacceptable, and the graphics are as flat as they come - it feels more like you're dealing with cardboard cutouts than any sort of 3D realm. Avoid this title at all costs."

Reviews
Computer Games Magazine - 1997

References

1996 video games
First-person shooters
Sprite-based first-person shooters
Video games based on films
Video games developed in the United States
Video games with 2.5D graphics
Westworld
Windows games
Windows-only games